

The Fokker T.IX was a Dutch twin-engined bomber designed and built by Fokker for the Royal Netherlands East Indies Army Air Force as a replacement for their obsolescent Martin-built bombers.

Development
Design of the T.IX was started in 1938 as the company's first all-metal bomber project. It was a mid-wing monoplane with twin fins and rudders and retractable landing gear, powered by two 1375 hp (1025 kW) Bristol Hercules radial piston engines. The T.IX first flew on 11 September 1939, but in April 1940 during testing it was damaged when it collided with a hangar door. The subsequent German invasion of the Netherlands stopped repair and further development.

Specifications

References

Notes

Bibliography

T 09
1930s Dutch bomber aircraft
Aircraft first flown in 1939
Twin piston-engined tractor aircraft
Mid-wing aircraft